Catarina de San Juan (birth ca.1607/place unknown; death 5 January 1688, Puebla, Mexico) known as the China Poblana was an Asian slave who, according to legend, belonged to a noble family from India. She was brought to Mexico through the Spanish East Indies (Philippines), and has been credited since the Porfiriato with creating the China Poblana dress. After converting to Catholicism in Cochin —an Indian city where she was kidnapped by Portuguese pirates—Mirra was given the Christian name Catarina de San Juan, the name she was known as in Puebla de Zaragoza  where she worked as a slave, married, and eventually became a beata - a religious woman who took personal religious vows without entering a convent (see anchorite). Upon her death, Catarina de San Juan was buried in the sacristy of the Jesuit Templo de la Compañía de Jesús in Puebla, in what is popularly known as Tumba de la China Poblana.

History 

What is known about the life of Catarina de San Juan is from published seventeenth-century texts.  One is the funeral sermon, preached by Jesuit Francisco de Aguilera, and two are by her confessors, Jesuit Alonso Ramos, who wrote a three-volume life of Catarina, and a parish priest, José del Castillo Grajeda, who wrote hagiographies of her life, at the request of Diego Carrillo de Mendoza y Pimentel, Marquis of Gélves and Viceroy of New Spain. Ramos' three-volume life of Catarina is by one scholar's account the most lengthy published text during the colonial era.

The account of her life is improbable and has been extensively studied by modern scholars not so much as text narrating history but as an example of the ways that colonial hagiographers constructed the text of a holy person's life (vida).

According to these sources, a young Indian woman was brought from the Philippines by merchant ship to be the viceroy's personal servant. This girl, named Mirra, was kidnapped by Portuguese pirates and taken to Cochin (modern-day Kochi), in the south of India. There, she escaped her kidnappers and took refuge in a Jesuit mission, where she was baptized with the name Catarina de San Juan. Mirra was then delivered to Manila where she was purchased as a slave by a merchant who later took her to New Spain. But once they disembarked in the port of Acapulco, instead of delivering her to the Marquis, the merchant sold her as a slave to the Pueblan man Miguel de Sosa for ten times the price that the viceroy had promised for her.

Catarina de San Juan, or Mirra (or Mira/Meera), followed the style of dress of her birth country, India, completely wrapped in a sari that covered her whole body. She could have worn the Langa Voni which consists of a blouse and a petticoat. It is possible that this mode of dress gave rise to the china dress. A few years after her arrival in Mexico, Miguel de Sosa died, providing in his will for the manumission of his slave. She was taken in by a convent, where it is said she began to have visions of the Virgin Mary and Baby Jesus.

Catarina de San Juan died 5 January 1688 at the age of 82 years. In Puebla de los Ángeles she was venerated as a popular saint until 1691, when the Holy Inquisition prohibited open devotion to her. Today, the former Jesuit church, the Templo de la Compañía, in Puebla, is known as La Tumba de la China Poblana because in its sacristy lie the remains of Catarina de San Juan.

Further reading
 Bailey, Gauvin Alexander. "A Mughal Princess in Baroque New Spain: Catarina de San Juan (1606-1688), The China Poblana." Anales del Instituto de Investigaciones Estéticas 71 (1997) 37–73.
 Carrasco Puente, Rafael. Bibliografía de Catarina de San Juan y la China Poblana. Mexico: Secretaría de Relaciones Exteriores 1950.
 León, Nicolás. Catarina de San Juan y La China poblana: estudio etnográfico critico. Puebla: Ediciones Altiplano 1971.
 Maza, Francisco de la.  Catarina de San Juan: princesa de la India y visionaria de Puebla. Mexico: CONACULTA 1990.
 Morgan, Ronald J. "Very Good Blood": Reconstructing the Asian Identity of Catarina de San Juan" in Spanish American Saints and the Rhetoric of Identity. Tucson: University of Arizona Press 2002, 119–42.
 Myers. Kathleen Ann. "La China Poblana, Catarina de San Juan (ca. 1607-1688): Hagiography and the Inquisition." In Neither Saints nor Sinners: Writing the Lives of Women in Spanish America. Oxford: Oxford University Press 2003.
 Myers, Kathleen Ann. "Testimony for Canonization or Proof of Blasphemy? The New Spanish Inquisition and the Hagiographic Biography of Catarina de San Juan." In Women in the Inquisition: Spain and the New World. edited by Mary E. Giles. Baltimore: The Johns Hopkins University Press 1999, 270–95.

References

External links
 A Mughal Princess in Baroque New Spain

1688 deaths
Mexican people of Indian descent
People of New Spain
People from Puebla
Converts to Roman Catholicism
Mexican culture
Mexican slaves
Mexican folklore
Indian slaves
17th-century slaves
17th-century Mexican women